Tara Patkar (born 7 June 1970) was born in Mahoba district, India. Previously a journalist, he is a social activist and social reformer. With the aim to tackle hunger within Mahoba, Patkar founded the Bundeli Samaj and the country's first Roti Bank. His team feeds around 1000 people daily.

Early life and education 
Patkar was born into an ordinary family. Tara completed his early education in D.A.V. Inter College Mahoba and obtained a Master of Journalism from Lucknow University. After that he gave 22 years to journalism. Following this, he returned to his native land Mahoba. He observed poverty—specifically hunger—and growing disease. He also laid the foundations of the Roti Bank and with this he demanded AIIMS in Mahoba.

Famous works

Founding of Roti Bank 
Roti Bank was established on 15 April 2015. Tara Patkar and his team do not want anyone to sleep on an empty stomach, so Bundeli Samaj founded a Roti Bank in Mahoba. This Roti Bank provides around 1000 needy people with food daily. After Mahoba, Roti Banks were formed in all the districts of Bundelkhand; they were operational in all the major cities of the country. Prime Minister Narendra Modi mentioned the roti bank in Mann ki Baat.

Demanding separate Bundelkhand state
In 2018, Patkar fasted in protest to make Bundelkhand a separate state. Bundelkhand a low quality or education and healthcare compared to other states, and experiences little development through the government.  This is why he and his supporters went on hunger strike.  So far, he has sent more than two lakh letters to the Prime Minister.

Founder of Bundeli Samaj

Demand AIIMS Hospital in Mahoba

References

External links 
 

1970 births
Living people
Social workers
People from Mahoba
Indian journalists